Lennon Eduardo Carvalho Celestino, commonly known as Lennon (born October 2, 1991 in city: Franca state: São Paulo) is a Brazilian footballer.

Career
Lennon was part of the youth squad at Desportivo Brasil, before signing for the team's American sister club Miami FC (which is also owned by Traffic Sports) in 2010.

Lennon made his professional debut on August 7, 2010 in a 1–1 tie with the Puerto Rico Islanders. He re-signed with the club, now renamed Fort Lauderdale Strikers and playing in the North American Soccer League, on February 8, 2011. Lennon left the club and returned to Brazil on July 20, 2011.

References

1991 births
Living people
Brazilian footballers
Fort Lauderdale Strikers players
Miami FC (2006) players
North American Soccer League players
USSF Division 2 Professional League players
Desportivo Brasil players
Real Monarchs players
USL Championship players
Association football midfielders